Tuiuti may refer to:

Tuiuti, São Paulo, municipality in São Paulo, Brazil
Paraíso do Tuiuti, a samba school in Rio de Janeiro, Brazil
Tuyutí, marsh and pond in Paraguay
Battle of Tuyutí, 1867 battle of the Paraguayan War at Tuyutí